The Battle of Alto de los Godos was a battle that took place on 25 May 1813 in Maturín, Venezuela, in the Spanish colonial Viceroyalty of New Granada. It resulted in a patriot victory against the forces of Spanish general Domingo de Monteverde. 

It was one of the five attempts by the royalists to regain control over the region and it is notable for its inclusion of women in combat, such as Juana Ramírez, who was also known as "The Advancer" (La Avanzadora).

See also

Alto de los Godos
Colonial Venezuela
1813 in Venezuela
1813 in the Viceroyalty of New Granada
May 1813 events